Anzhelika Vadimovna Stubailo (born 5 September 2001) is a Russian group rhythmic gymnast. She is the 2019 World Group All-around champion and the 2019 European Games Group All-around bronze medalist.

Personal life 
Anzhelika Stubailo was born on 5 September 2001, in Volgograd. She began rhythmic gymnastics when she was 3 years old. She is currently a student at the Lesgaft National State University of Physical Education, Sport and Health in St. Petersburg, Russia.

Career 
Stubailo joined the main group of Russia's national rhythmic gymnastics team in 2019. She competed at the 2019 European Games in Minsk along with Vera Biryukova, Anastasia Maksimova, Anastasia Shishmakova, and Maria Tolkacheva. They won the gold medal in the group 5 balls event with a score of 27.300, but they only placed 5th in the group 3 hoops and 4 clubs. They won the bronze medal in the group all-around behind the Belarusian and Bulgarian groups.

Stubailo then competed at the 2019 World Championships in Baku alongside Evgeniia Levanova, Maksimova, Shishmakova, and Tolkacheva. They won the gold medal in the group all-around and qualified for both of the group apparatus finals. They won the bronze medal in 5 Balls behind the Japanese and Bulgarian groups, and the won the gold medal in the 3 Hoops and 4 Clubs.

References

Extrernal links 
 

2001 births
Living people
Russian rhythmic gymnasts
Medalists at the Rhythmic Gymnastics World Championships
Gymnasts at the 2019 European Games
European Games gold medalists for Russia
European Games bronze medalists for Russia
European Games medalists in gymnastics
Sportspeople from Volgograd